The horned coot (Fulica cornuta) is a species of bird found in the Andes of South America. It was described by Bonaparte in 1853 based on a specimen collected in Bolivia. For a long time it was known only from the type specimen.

Description
Horned coot males average a little larger than the female.

While most coots have a horny shield on the forehead, the horned coot has three wattles in both sexes. The central wattle is large and may possibly be erectile. The three wattles terminate in tufts of filoplumes. At the base of the beak and below the wattle is a fleshy caruncle which is whitish. The bill is olive yellow, brightening to dull orange towards the base. Unlike the giant coot, the legs of the horned coot are dull greenish.

Breeding

The horned coot is monogamous, and sometimes breeds in colonies of up to 80 pairs. The huge nest is typically located about 40 metres from the shore in the waters of the high altitude lakes where it breeds. Pebbles are piled by the birds to form an artificial island that reaches the water surface. This island is then covered with algae to form the nest. It has been estimated that the pebble mounds may weigh as much as 1.5 tons and they are refurbished in each season. They breed from November to January.

Distribution and habitat
The coot occurs in the altiplano of north-western Argentina, south-western Bolivia, and north-eastern Chile. It is almost entirely restricted to lakes at altitudes of 3000–5200 m.a.s.l., but has occasionally been recorded at lower altitudes.

Status and conservation
It is generally a low-density species and the total population has been estimated at 10,000–20,000, with as few as 620 in the Chilean part of its range. Consequently, it is considered to be near threatened by BirdLife International and IUCN.

References

External links

 Photos and call
 3D specimen

horned coot
Birds of Argentina
Birds of the Bolivian Andes
Birds of Chile
Birds of the Southern Andes
horned coot
horned coot
Taxonomy articles created by Polbot